Lakshmanan is a common Indian name that may refer to:

A. R. Lakshmanan, former judge of the Supreme Court of India
C. K. Lakshmanan, British-Indian Olympian 
G. Lakshmanan, Indian politician 
S. Lakshmanan, Indian politician 
Lakshmanan Sathyavagiswaran, former Chief Medical Examiner-Coroner for the County of Los Angeles
Savithri Lakshmanan, Indian politician
V. K. Lakshmanan, Indian politician 
Lakshmana, brother of Rama is also spelt this way.